Don't Get Around Much Anymore – Live at Bullerbyn is a live 1975 jazz recording of a two-evening jam session at the Bullerbyn jazz club, Stockholm, Sweden. It features two Duke Ellington compositions, including the title track, in tribute to earlier Stockholm recordings by Ben Webster and Rolf Ericson, both of whom had been mermbers of the Ellington Orchestra.

Track listing 

"Hallelujah (I Love Her So)" (Ray Charles)
"Don't Get Around Much Anymore" (Duke Ellington, Bob Russell)
"As Time Goes By" (Herman Hupfeld)
"In a Mellow Tone" (Duke Ellington, Milt Gabler)
"What's New?" (Bob Haggart)
"Sunny" (Bobby Hebb)

Personnel 

 Rolf "Roffe" Ericson - trumpet
 Dick Morrissey - tenor saxophone
 Berndt Egerbladh - piano
 Terry Smith - guitar
 Sture Nordin - double bass
 Rune Carlsson - drums
 Tommy Körberg - vocals

References 

 Swedish jazz recordings archive

1975 live albums
Polydor Records live albums